Shakva is a rural locality (a village) in Pereborskoye Rural Settlement, Beryozovsky District, Perm Krai, Russia. The population was 75 as of 2010. There are 5 streets.

Geography 
Shakva is located on the Shakva River, 10 km north of  Beryozovka, the district's administrative centre, by road. Slobodka is the nearest rural locality.

References 

Rural localities in Beryozovsky District, Perm Krai